KEJJ (98.3 FM) is a radio station broadcasting a classic hits format. Licensed to Gunnison, Colorado, United States, the station is currently owned by John Harvey Rees. The station is the primary broadcaster in the valley for the Gunnison High School and Western Colorado University athletic events.

History
The station was assigned the call letters KGUC-FM on February 18, 1981, as an unknown soft format station. On May 22, 1992, the station changed its call sign to KKYY, and on January 16, 1998, to the current KEJJ.

References

External links

EJJ
Classic hits radio stations in the United States